The Newfoundland Ridge is an ocean ridge in the northern Atlantic Ocean, located on the east coast of Canada. It was the site for major volcanic activity in the Barremian–Aptian period.

See also
Volcanism of Canada
Volcanism of Eastern Canada

References

Seamounts of the Atlantic Ocean
Volcanism of Newfoundland and Labrador